The Thai identity card is an official identity document issued to Thai nationals between the age of 7 and 70 years. It was first introduced in 1943 when Plaek Phibunsongkram was the Prime Minister. The minimum age was originally 16 years but later altered to 15 in 1983 and 7 in 2011.

The card is used for proving the holder's identity and receiving government services. Other private services, such as applying for a mobile phone contract or opening a bank account, also require a production of valid identity card. Failure to produce a card without good reasons can result in up to ฿200 fine.

History 
Prior to the introduction of an identification card in 1943, anyone who wanted to travel can apply for an internal passport at the district office. However, the law was rarely enforced until 1943, when a compulsory identification book law was enacted. Thai nationals who were 16 and older and lived within designated areas were required to have an identification book, similar to the existing internal passport.

In 1963, an identification book was replaced by a smaller laminated paper card featuring holder's photo with height scale. All personal information was typewritten on the obverse side. Date of issue and expiry were typed on the reverse. The cost charged was ฿5 (around ฿90 today) for any issuance, whether of a new card or a replacement. It was at this time that identification cards became legally required by every Thai citizen. However, the card could be forged easily as there was no security features. It could also be damaged easily due to being made with paper.

With the introduction of microfilm, dot matrix printer and mainframe computer, the 1963 card became obsolete in 1987. At that time, Thai nationals were assigned unique 13-digit personal numbers that integrated the card issuance with other registrations. Thai nationals who turned 15 had to apply for a card in person at a district office. The card production was centralized; this meant all application forms and thumb prints had to be microfilmed and submitted to the registration administration bureau in Bangkok for further processing. The card was made of paper printed by dot matrix printer and laminated with special coating.

In 1996, all identification cards issued in Bangkok were printed on site using a computer system. Outside Bangkok, on the other hand, a registrar had to submit paper forms for manual processing. Since then, the card issuing system was subsequently implemented nationwide. However, the information provided on the card is all in Thai; one had to translate the card for use in foreign countries. As a result, in 2005, a bilingual national identification card was adopted and is still in use today.

In 2011, the government led by Abhisit Vejjajiva proposed that the minimum age for identification card should be reduced from 15 to 7 years, in order to reduce the use of birth certificate and other evidences for children.

Identification number 
In 1909, the Thai government launched a census surveying people across the country, including immigrants, for the purpose of taxation and conscription. The system was simple and home owners were not obliged to register an entry. Eight years later, home owners in selected areas were required to register deaths and births in their home to authorities The law was then expanded nationwide in 1956. Despite the existence of a citizen register, there was no unique identification number for a person. This later raised a security problem, especially when communism expanded into Thailand. Foreign criminals might forge identification cards and personal records relatively easily.

On 19 September 1985, the Central Bureau of Registration (now the Bureau of Registration Administration) was established and a 13-digit national identification number was introduced. The structure of the Thai identification number is:

The meaning of each section is as follows:  denotes the category of the particular person, which can either be:

 stands for the ISO 3166-2 code for the registrar's office.  is either the birth certificate number, which comprises book number and sheet ID, or a personal number (for people who were born before 1 January 1984). Finally  denotes a checksum.

An identification number appears on all identification cards, house registration books and other official documents. It helps identify different people who might share the same name as well as aids legal enforcement.

Format 
The identification card comprises basic information on the holder, including

 Identification number
 Title, given and family name;
Date of birth
Address
 Date of issue
 Date of expiry, 8 years after issue date on cardholder's birthday 
Photo of the card holder

All entries except the address are provided in both Thai and English and printed on bluish white card. In addition to this, the issuer's signature and seal is printed on the same side of the card. Prior to 2005, all information was given in Thai only. The issuer's signature was on the reverse side as there was not enough space.

Other identity documents 
 Identity card for person without Thai nationality
 Identity card for person without registration status

See also 
 List of national identity card policies by country

References

External links
 DOPA website
 Thailand Revenue Office website

Law of Thailand
Thailand